The fifth season of The Great Australian Bake Off premiered on 3 October 2019 on the LifeStyle channel.

The Bakers
The following is the list of the bakers that are competing this season:

{| class="wikitable" style="text-align:center"
|-
! style="background:skyblue" "color:black;"| Baker
! style="background:skyblue" "color:black;"| Age 
! style="background:skyblue" "color:black;"| Occupation 
! style="background:skyblue" "color:black;"| Hometown
! style="background:skyblue" "color:black;"| Competition Status
|-
| Subha "Sunny" Nasir Ahmad
| 26 
| PHD Science Student
| Sydney, New South Wales
| style="background:gold"| Season winner
|-
| Daniel "Dan" Pasquali
| 35
| Research Scientist 
| Brisbane, Queensland
| style="background:limegreen"| Season runner-up
|-
| David Hills
| 41
| Project Manager
| Melbourne, Victoria
| style="background:limegreen"| Season runner-up
|-
| Donald "Don" Hackett
| 55
| Superannuation Consultant 
| Sydney, New South Wales
| style="background:tomato"| Eliminated (Episode 9)
|-
| Angela Navacchi
| 36
| Housewife
| Adelaide, South Australia
| style="background:tomato"| Eliminated (Episode 8)
|-
| Wynn Visser
| 36
| Disability Services Manager
| Sydney, New South Wales
| style="background:tomato"| Eliminated (Episode 7)
|-
| Anston Ratnayake
| 28
| Student Voice Officer 
| Sydney, New South Wales
| style="background:tomato"| Eliminated (Episode 6)
|-
| Sue Dahman
| 70
| Retired Bank Manager
| Sydney, New South Wales
| style="background:tomato"| Eliminated (Episode 4)
|-
| Laura Peters
| 22 
| Cafe Manager
| New South Wales 
| style="background:Orange"| Left (Episode 3)
|-
| Dennis Mews
| 71
| Retired Maths Teacher
| Melbourne, Victoria
| style="background:tomato"| Eliminated (Episode 3)
|-
| Annette Peffers
| 48
| Account Manager
| Gold Coast, Queensland
| style="background:tomato"| Eliminated (Episode 2)
|-
| Zee Scott
| 39
| Marriage Celebrant
| Melbourne, Victoria
| style="background:tomato"| Eliminated (Episode 1)
|}

Results summary

Colour key:

Episodes

Episode 1: Cakes

Episode 2: Bread

Episode 3: Biscuits

Episode 4: Vegan

Episode 5: Classics

Episode 6: Patisserie

Episode 7: Spice

Episode 8: Hybrid

Episode 9: Party

Episode 10: Final

Ratings

References

5
2019 Australian television seasons